Big Creek is an unincorporated locality and former post office in the Chilcotin District of British Columbia, Canada, located south of Hanceville on the creek of the same name.  The post office first opened in 1907 and was closed in 1975.

Climate

References

Unincorporated settlements in British Columbia
Populated places in the Chilcotin